The Dallas phase (c. 1300–1600 CE) is an archaeological phase, within the Mississippian III period, in the South Appalachian Geologic province in North America.

Geography
Dallas peoples moved into what is now southwest Virginia from northeastern Tennessee in the early 13th century. Dallas phase settlements ranged from along the Holston River to Cobb Island, and up the Nolichucky River and Little Pigeon Creek in Tennessee, and along the Clinch River in Virginia.

Characteristics
The Dallas phase settlements typically have one to three platform mounds; however, some (40Un11 and 40An44) have no mounds at all. Their society was hierarchical. It is characterized by distinctions between nobles and commoners in burial practices. Elites were buried in mounds, unlike the remaining population. Artifacts included shell gorgets, ear pins, and beads.

Dallas peoples built "large log houses." Their towns had central plazas, surrounded by winter and summer homes.

Ceramics

Dallas Ware pottery was tempered with mussel shells and featured lugs, incised decoration, notched fillets, and strap handles. Two distinct styles were Dallas Plain and Dallas Cordmarked.

Sites

Dallas phase sites include the following:
 Bussell Island (40LD17), Loudon County, Tennessee
 Chiaha, Jefferson County, Tennessee
 Citico (40HA65), Chattanooga, Hamilton County, Tennessee
 Cox site (40AN19), Anderson County, Tennessee
 David Davis Site (40HA301), Hamilton County, Tennessee
 DeArmond Site (40RE12), Roane County, Tennessee 
 Fain's Island (40JE1), Jefferson County, Tennessee
 Henderson Site (40SV4), Sevier County, Tennessee
 Henry Farm Site (40LD53), Loudon County, Tennessee
 Hiwassee Island Site (40MG31), Meigs County, Tennessee
 Hixon Site (40HA3), Hamilton County, Tennessee
 McMahan Mound Site (40SV1), Sevier County, Tennessee
 Toqua (40MR6), Monroe County, Tennessee

Overhill Cherokee sites, such as Citico (40Mr7), Hiwassee Old Town (40Pk3), and Chilhowee (40Bt7) have Dallas phase artifacts; however, the Dallas phase is associated with ancestral Muscogee Creek peoples.

Dates
In the same region, the Hiwassee Island phase ran from 1000 to 1250 CE, followed by Early Dallas from 1250–1450 CE. Late Dallas ranged from 1450–1650 CE, which was followed by the Overhill Cherokee and Mouse Creek phases.

See also
List of archaeological sites in Tennessee

Notes

References
Harle, Michaelyn S. "Biological Affinities and the Construction of Cultural Identity for the Proposed Coosa Chiefdom." University of Tennessee. Trace: Tennessee Research and Creative Exchange. 2010.
Peregrine, Peter Neal. Archaeology of the Mississippian Culture: A Research Guide. Taylor and Francis, 1996. .
Sullivan, Lynne P. and Susan C. Prezzano, eds. Archaeology of the Appalachian Highlands. Knoxville: University of Tennessee Press, 2001. .

External links
 The Archaeology of Everyday Life at Early Moundville Gregory D. Wilson
 South Appalachian and Protohistoric Mortuary Practices in Southwestern North Carolina

South Appalachian Mississippian culture
Pre-statehood history of Tennessee
Native American history of Virginia
Pre-statehood history of Virginia